North Cork, a division of County Cork, was a parliamentary constituency in Ireland, represented in the Parliament of the United Kingdom. From 1885 to 1922 it returned one Member of Parliament (MP) to the House of Commons of the United Kingdom of Great Britain and Ireland.

Until the 1885 general election the area was part of the Cork County constituency. From 1922 it was not represented in the UK Parliament, as it was no longer in the UK.

Boundaries
This constituency comprised the northern part of County Cork, consisting of the baronies of Duhallow and Orrery and Kilmore and that part of the barony of Fermoy contained within the parishes of Ardskeagh, Ballyhay, Doneraile and Imphrick, and the townland of Ballylopen in the parish of Kilquane.

Members of Parliament

Elections

Elections in the 1880s

Elections in the 1890s

Elections in the 1900s

Elections in the 1910s

Guiney died in office and was succeeded by his brother John Guiney at a by-election held on 4 November 1913.

References

Westminster constituencies in County Cork (historic)
Dáil constituencies in the Republic of Ireland (historic)
Constituencies of the Parliament of the United Kingdom established in 1885
Constituencies of the Parliament of the United Kingdom disestablished in 1922